This is a list of 2005 British incumbents.

Government
 Monarch
 Head of State – Elizabeth II, Queen of the United Kingdom (1952–2022)
 Prime Minister
 Head of Government – Tony Blair, Prime Minister of the United Kingdom, First Lord of the Treasury and Minister for the Civil Service (1997–2007)
Deputy Prime Minister
 Deputy Head of Government – John Prescott, Deputy Prime Minister of the United Kingdom and First Secretary of State (1997–2007)
Chancellor of the Exchequer
 Head of the Treasury – Gordon Brown, Chancellor of the Exchequer and Second Lord of the Treasury (1997–2007)
Foreign Secretary
 Jack Straw, Secretary of State for Foreign and Commonwealth Affairs (2001–2007)
Secretary of State for the Home Department
Charles Clarke, Secretary of State for the Home Department (2004–2007)
Secretary of State for Environment, Food and Rural Affairs
 Margaret Beckett, Secretary of State for Environment, Food and Rural Affairs (2001–2007)
Secretary of State for Transport
 Alistair Darling, Secretary of State for Transport (2002–2007)
Secretary of State for Scotland
 Alistair Darling, Secretary of State for Scotland (2003–2007)
Secretary of State for Health
 John Reid, Secretary of State for Health (2003–2005)
 Patricia Hewitt, Secretary of State for Health (2005–2007)
Secretary of State for Northern Ireland
 Peter Hain, Secretary of State for Northern Ireland (2002–2007)
Secretary of State for Defence
 John Reid, Secretary of State for Defence (1999–2007)
Secretary of State for Trade and Industry
 Patricia Hewitt, Secretary of State for Trade and Industry (2001–2007)
Minister for Women and Equality
 Patricia Hewitt, Minister for Women and Equality (2001–2007)
Secretary of State for Culture, Media and Sport
 Tessa Jowell, Secretary of State for Culture, Media and Sport (2005–2007)
Secretary of State for Education and Skills
 Ruth Kelly, Secretary of State for Education and Skills (2002–2007)
Secretary of State for Wales
 Secretary of State for Wales (2005–2007)
Leader of the House of Commons
 Peter Hain, Leader of the House of Commons and Lord Privy Seal (2003–2007)
Leader of the House of Lords
 Baroness Amos, Leader of the House of Lords and Lord President of the Council (2003–2007)
Secretary of State for Constitutional Affairs
 Charles Falconer, Baron Falconer of Thoroton, Secretary of State for Constitutional Affairs and Lord Chancellor (2003–2007)
Secretary of State for International Development
 Hilary Benn, Secretary of State for International Development (2003–2007)
Secretary of State for Work and Pensions
 Alan Johnson, Secretary of State for Work and Pensions (2004–2007)
Chancellor of the Duchy of Lancaster
 Alan Milburn, Chancellor of the Duchy of Lancaster (2004–2007)
First Minister of Scotland
 Jack McConnell, First Minister of Scotland (2001–2007)
Deputy First Minister of Scotland
 Jim Wallace then Nicol Stephen
First Minister of Wales
Rhodri Morgan

Religion
 Archbishop of Canterbury
Rowan Williams, Archbishop of Canterbury (2003–2012)
 Archbishop of York
 David Hope, Archbishop of York (1995–2005; retired 28 February)
 John Sentamu, Archbishop of York (2005–present; installed 10 May)

Royalty
 Prince consort
 The Duke of Edinburgh (m. 1947)
 Heir apparent
 The Prince of Wales (1958–present)

Leaders
2005
British incumbents